Organization is a peer-reviewed academic journal that covers the field of management and organization studies. The editors-in-chief are Raza Mir (William Paterson University) and Patrizia Zanoni (Hasselt University). It was established in 1994 and is published by SAGE Publications.

Abstracting and indexing 
The journal is abstracted and indexed in Scopus, and the Social Sciences Citation Index. According to the Journal Citation Reports, its 2021 impact factor is 3.301, ranking it 143th out of 391 journals in the category "Management".

References

External links 
 

SAGE Publishing academic journals
English-language journals
Bimonthly journals
Publications established in 1994
Business and management journals